Bristow Cove is an unincorporated community and census-designated place (CDP) in Etowah County, Alabama, United States. Its population was 624 as of the 2020 census.

Demographics

References

Census-designated places in Etowah County, Alabama
Census-designated places in Alabama
Unincorporated communities in Alabama
Unincorporated communities in Etowah County, Alabama